Leandro Müller (born November 14, 1978) is a Brazilian writer. He has a double degree in Journalism and Advertising from the Federal University of Rio de Janeiro (Universidade Federal do Rio de Janeiro). Muller a student of Philosophy at the State University of Rio de Janeiro (Universidade Estadual do Rio de Janeiro - Brazil) and at Porto University (Universidade do Porto, Portugal) has been writing since 2004. He also worked as an editor in publishing.

His first novel, "O Código Aleijadinho" (Aleijadinho’s code), was published in 2006. This thriller is set in five different cities in the Brazilian state of Minas Gerais, a place that still has a colonial period atmosphere. The novel’s plot presents some real Brazilian artists and historical characters from the independence movement, which was born in this region and was known as Inconfidência Mineira.

In 2008, Müller was awarded the Prémio Máster en Edición from the Spanish group of Santillana for his novel "Pequeño Tratado Hermético sobre Efectos de Superficie" (A small hermetic treaty about Effects of Surface) and published by Ediciones Universidad Salamanca, a Publishing House from the traditional University of Salamanca. This novel is introduced by the Spanish writer Enrique Vila-Matas.

Works
 O Código Aleijadinho (Aleijadinho’s code) – published by Espaço e Tempo (Rio de Janeiro, 2006)
 Pequeño Tratado Hermético sobre Efectos de Superficie (A small hermetic treaty about Effects of Surface) – published by Ediciones Universidad Salamanca (Salamanca, 2008)

Awards
 Honorable award in the poetry contest organized by the Student’s Association from the Porto University (Portugal, 2007)
 Prémio Máster en Edición do Santillana Formación (Spain, 2008)

References

External links
 Prêmio Leandro Müller de Literatura (pt)
 Entrevista concedida à Revista Museu (pt)
 Editora Garamond (pt)
 Ediciones Universidad Salamanca (es)

1978 births
Living people
21st-century Brazilian novelists
Brazilian people of German descent
Brazilian male novelists
Federal University of Rio de Janeiro alumni
Rio de Janeiro State University alumni
University of Porto alumni
People from Juiz de Fora
21st-century Brazilian male writers